Oriol Combarros (born 12 May 1980) is a Spanish gymnast. He competed at the 2004 Summer Olympics.

References

External links
 

1980 births
Living people
Spanish male artistic gymnasts
Olympic gymnasts of Spain
Gymnasts at the 2004 Summer Olympics
Gymnasts from Barcelona